Rivarola is a surname. Notable people with the surname include:

Alfonso Rivarola (1607–1640), Italian painter of the Renaissance period
Catalino Rivarola (born 1965), former football defender from Paraguay
Cirilo Antonio Rivarola (1836–1879), President of Paraguay March 1, 1870 – December 10, 1871
Diego Rivarola (born 1976), Argentinian player
Eduardo Airaldi Rivarola (1922–1992), Peruvian basketball player, coach, referee and administrator
Germán Rivarola (born 1979), Argentine football defender
José María Rivarola Matto, (born 1917), son of Octaviano Rivarola Bogarín and Victoriana Matto
Juan Bautista Rivarola Matto (1933–1999), Paraguayan journalist, narrator, essayist and playwright
Juan Manuel Rivarola (1899–1985), Argentine chess player